Histura berylla is a species of moth of the family Tortricidae. It is found in Veracruz, Mexico.

The wingspan is 10–15 mm. The ground colour of the forewings is greenish, with green diffuse parts. The markings are also green. The hindwings are pale brownish grey.

Etymology
The species name refers to the colouration of the forewing.

References

Moths described in 2011
Polyorthini